The Catholic Church in the Republic of Congo is part of the worldwide Catholic Church, under the spiritual leadership of the Pope in Rome.

There are over two million Catholics in the country, comprising just under half of the country's total population. There are three archdioceses and six suffragan dioceses.

Brazzaville
Gamboma
Kinkala
Owando
Impfondo
Ouesso
Pointe-Noire
Dolisie
Nkayi

References

 
Congo
Congo